Karen Struthers (born 19 February 1963) is an Australian politician who served in the Legislative Assembly of Queensland from 1998 to 2012.

Early life and career
Before she was elected Struthers was an Assistant Director of the Queensland Council of Social Service.

Member of parliament
She first entered Parliament at the 1998 election, winning the seat of Archerfield after the retirement of sitting member Len Ardill.

Archerfield was abolished in a redistribution ahead of the 2001 state election, and Struthers followed most of her constituents into the new seat of Algester, which she held until her defeat in the 2012 election.

Beattie Ministry
She was promoted to the front bench on 12 February 2004 as Parliamentary Secretary to the Premier (Multicultural Affairs) and Minister for Trade. She was appointed Parliamentary Secretary to the Minister for Employment, Training and Industrial Relations on 28 July 2005 and became Parliamentary Secretary to the Minister of Health on 13 September 2006.

Bligh Ministry
In March 2009, she was promoted to the Cabinet as Minister for Community Services and Housing and Minister for Women.

Struthers was one of several Labor MPs in previously safe seats who were swept out in the massive Liberal National landslide of 2012, losing to LNP challenger Anthony Shorten on a swing of over 18 percent—enough to turn the seat from safe Labor to safe LNP in one stroke. In a measure of the backlash against Labor that year, Struthers had seen off a challenge from Shorten in 2009, taking 59 percent of the two-party vote.

Personal life
She has one son.

References

1963 births
Living people
Members of the Queensland Legislative Assembly
Australian Labor Party members of the Parliament of Queensland
21st-century Australian politicians
21st-century Australian women politicians
Women members of the Queensland Legislative Assembly